River Road Entertainment is an American independent film production company founded in 1987 by Bill Pohlad, who is also the company's president. It is based in Los Angeles and Minneapolis. Films produced by River Road include 12 Years A Slave, The Tree of Life, and American Utopia. Other titles include Into The Wild, Wild, Fair Game, Love & Mercy (which Pohlad also directed), Brokeback Mountain, A Prairie Home Companion, and A Monster Calls, as well as feature documentary films, including Food, Inc.

History
Bill Pohlad founded River Road Entertainment in 1987.

In October 2006, veteran Frank Hildebrand was appointed head of production, ex-director of Film Finance Corporation Australia, Deborah Zisper took care of the business.

In September 2007, Mitch Horwits was promoted to president of the company.

In July 2008, River Road invested in the financing of The Runaways, a biopic about the history of one of the american female rock and roll bands of the 1970s, named The Runaways, which included Joan Jett, Cherie Curie, and the late Sandy West.

In April 2017, Gray Rembert joined the company as executive vice president after he left GK Films.

In June 2020, Kim Roth was appointed Co-President and Creative Director of the company, then promoted Christa Zofcin Workman to Co-President and COO.

Films

References

External links
 

1987 establishments in Minnesota
American companies established in 1987
Companies based in Los Angeles
Companies based in Minneapolis
Entertainment companies based in California
Film production companies of the United States
Mass media companies established in 1987
Privately held companies based in California
Privately held companies based in Minnesota